Ludwig van Beethoven's Piano Sonata No. 4, in E major, Op. 7, sometimes nicknamed the Grand Sonata, is dedicated to his student Babette, the Countess Keglevics. This piano sonata was composed in November 1796 in Bratislava, during his visit of Keglevich Palace. Beethoven named it Great Sonata, because it was published alone, which was unusual for the time.

Along with the Hammerklavier Sonata, it is one of the longest piano sonatas of Beethoven. A typical performance lasts about 28 minutes.

Structure 

The sonata is in four movements:

Analysis

I. Allegro molto e con brio 

The first movement is in sonata form.

II. Largo con gran espressione 

The second movement is in ternary form.

III. Allegro 

The third movement is in scherzo and trio form.

IV. Rondo: Poco allegretto e grazioso 

The fourth movement is in rondo form. This movement of the sonata in particular was featured in the documentary Note by Note: The Making of Steinway L1037

References
Notes

Sources

External links

A lecture by András Schiff on Beethoven's piano sonata, Op. 7
 For a public domain recording of this sonata visit Musopen
 - Discussion and analysis

European Archive Copyright-free LP recording of the Sonata no.4 op.7 in E♭ major by Hugo Steurer, piano at the European Archive (for non-American viewers only).

Piano Sonata 04
1796 compositions
Compositions in E-flat major
Music with dedications